Kicked Out is a 2010 anthology compiled and edited by Sassafras Lowrey.  The book includes personal narratives from homeless and formerly homeless LGBT youth, as well as policy essays from service providers. The book is intended to serve both as a "guidebook" and to draw attention to youth homelessness to the broader LGBT community.

The book calls for not only "more and better resources for at-risk LGBTQ youth, but also a transformation of the structures that maintain the epidemics of homelessness, suicidality, mental illness and addiction in this marginalized population."

The book's editor, Sassafras Lowrey, lived through homelessness, and shares hir story as part of the anthology.

Reception
The Lambda Literary Foundation gave the book a positive review, noting that while it acknowledged challenges facing LGBTQ youth, "the work emphasizes coping and resiliency."  Kicked out was a finalist for the Lambda Literary Award and was included on the American Library Association's Rainbow book list and Over the Rainbow book list.

References

External links 
Official site
Interview with the book's editor

2010s LGBT literature
2010 anthologies
2010 non-fiction books
Young adult non-fiction books
LGBT non-fiction books
LGBT anthologies
LGBT literature in the United States
LGBT and homelessness
Children's street culture